"Me Gustas Tú" is the second single from Manu Chao's second solo album, Próxima Estación: Esperanza. It has proved to be one of the artist's most popular songs worldwide. Its lyrics have a simple but catchy structure and it is mostly in Spanish with part of the chorus in French. The song, as well as two other tracks from the same album, "La primavera" and "Infinita tristeza", feature the same background music. In fact, on the album, "La primavera" fades and leads into "Me Gustas Tú".

Music video
A music video was produced for the song in Urrao, Colombia, featuring Manu Chao dancing and singing the lyrics while some spare words from it appear on the screen, always surrounded by a frame of colourful patterns. A blonde woman (Spanish actress Paz Gómez) dances beside him and sings at the end of the song.

Lyrics
"" means "I like you" in Spanish (literally, "You are pleasing to me"). The text "" is a tribute to the radio station Radio Reloj.

Track listing
 CD single
 "Me Gustas Tú" – 3:58
 "La primavera" – 1:52
 "Infinita tristeza" – 3:56

Charts

Weekly charts

Year-end charts

Certifications

See also
List of number-one hits of 2001 (Italy)
List of number-one singles of 2001 (Spain)

References

2001 singles
2001 songs
Manu Chao songs
Macaronic songs
Number-one singles in Italy
Spanish-language songs
Virgin Records singles